Events in the year 2022 in Laos.

Incumbents

Events 
Ongoing — COVID-19 pandemic in Laos

 7 July – The government of Laos discusses the purchase of oil from sanctions-hit Russia as the country faces oil shortages and is nearing a debt default.
 29 August – 2022 Laos floods: Recent flash floods caused by heavy rainfall in northern Laos have caused at least 5.6 billion Lao kips in damage.

Sports 

 Champasak Province Football Club is founded in Pakse, the team played in Lao League 1, with home games being played at the Champasak Stadium.
 2022 Lao League

References 

 

 
2020s in Laos
Years of the 21st century in Laos
Laos
Laos